Xanthonia villosula is a species of leaf beetle. It is found in the eastern United States and eastern Canada (Ontario, Quebec, New Brunswick and Nova Scotia). It is associated with numerous woody plants including oaks.

References

Further reading

 

Eumolpinae
Articles created by Qbugbot
Beetles described in 1847
Beetles of the United States
Insects of Canada
Taxa named by Frederick Ernst Melsheimer